Survival of motor neuron 2 (SMN2) is a gene that encodes the SMN protein (full and truncated) in humans.

Gene 

The SMN2 gene is part of a 500 kb inverted duplication on chromosome 5q13. This duplicated region contains at least four genes and repetitive elements which make it prone to rearrangements and deletions. The repetitiveness and complexity of the sequence have also caused difficulty in determining the organization of this genomic region. The telomeric (SMN1) and centromeric (SMN2) copies of this gene are nearly identical and encode the same protein. The critical sequence difference between the two genes is a single nucleotide in exon 7, which is thought to be an exon splice enhancer. The nucleotide substitution in SMN2 results in around 80-90% of its transcripts to be a truncated, unstable protein of no biological function (Δ7SMN) and only 10-20% of its transcripts being full-length protein (fl-SMN).

Note that the nine exons of both the telomeric and centromeric copies are designated historically as exon 1, 2a, 2b, and 3–8. It is thought that gene conversion events may involve the two genes, leading to varying copy numbers of each gene.

Clinical significance 
While mutations in the telomeric copy are associated with spinal muscular atrophy, mutations in this gene, the centromeric copy, do not lead to disease. This gene may be a modifier of disease caused by mutation in the telomeric copy.

References

Further reading 

 
 
 
 
 
 
 
 
 
 
 
 
 
 
 
 
 
 
 
 

Spinal muscular atrophy